Bristol Rovers F.C. spent the 1990–91  season in the Football League Second Division.

League table

Bristol Rovers F.C. seasons
Bristol